Alexander Hodge is an Australian actor. He is best known for portraying Andrew on the HBO series Insecure. Hodge has acted on Black Lightning, Resort to Love, and Joy Ride.

Early life and education
Hodge was born and raised in Sydney, Australia. His father is Irish and was raised in Australia; his mother is Chinese and was raised in Singapore. He described his environment as predominantly white. Hodge stated that he struggled with shame about his Chinese ancestry during childhood, which he attributed to internalized ideas about Asian men that he saw in mainstream media. He began acting in school at age 13 after being kicked out of a woodworking class. Hodge played rugby competitively and began to pursue it as a career. He severely injured his knee during a game when he was 21 and used a wheelchair during rehabilitation for the injury. Shortly after, Hodge moved to New York to attend acting school at the American Academy of Dramatic Arts, and relocated to Los Angeles after graduation in 2016.

Career
Hodge auditioned for the role of Andrew on season 3 of Insecure, a love interest to Molly. He was cast in the role, for which he gained wider prominence. The character was nicknamed "Asian Bae" by the show's viewers on social media. He was promoted to a member of the regular cast on season 4 of the show. Hodge has spoken about the significance of an Asian character who is shown as "confident" and "outspoken" because it challenges stereotypes about Asian men.

Hodge has acted in Modern Family, High Maintenance, Law & Order, and Tommy.

In 2021, Hodge guest starred as Philky on The CW series Black Lightning. He reprised the role in the backdoor spin-off series Painkiller, which the network did not pick up.  That year he played a supporting role in the Netflix movie, Resort to Love.

In 2022 it was announced that Hodge was cast in a supporting role in the film Which Brings Me To You. He is a supporting character in the upcoming Adele Lim film Joy Ride.

Personal life
Hodge resides in Los Angeles.

Filmography

Television

Film

References

External links
 
 Alexander Hodge on Instagram

Year of birth missing (living people)
Living people
21st-century Australian male actors
21st-century Chinese male actors
Male actors from Sydney
American Academy of Dramatic Arts alumni
Australian people of Chinese descent